Ukaleq Astri Slettemark (born 9 September 2001, in Nuuk) is a Greenlandic biathlete. She won gold in the 10 km Individual in the Biathlon Junior World Championships 2019. Slettemark made her debut in the world cup in Hochfilzen on 11 December 2020. She participated at the 2021 Biathlon World Championships in Pokljuka, Slovenia. She competed for Denmark at the 2022 Winter Olympics.

Slettemark parents are also biathletes, her father Øystein competed at the 2010 Winter Olympics representing Denmark, her mother Uiloq participated at the 2012 World Championships.

Biathlon results
All results are sourced from the International Biathlon Union.

Olympic Games

World Championships

Other competition

European Championships

Junior/Youth World Championships

See also
List of professional sports families

References 

2001 births
Living people
People from Nuuk
Greenlandic female biathletes
Danish female biathletes
Biathletes at the 2022 Winter Olympics
Olympic biathletes of Denmark